2020 ACC tournament may refer to:

 2020 ACC men's basketball tournament
 2020 ACC women's basketball tournament
 2020 Atlantic Coast Conference baseball tournament